The 2010 Shepherd Rams football team represented Shepherd University as a member of the West Virginia Intercollegiate Athletic Conference (WVIAC) during the 2010 NCAA Division II football season. Led by 24th-year head coach Monte Cater, the Rams compiled an overall record of 12–2 with a conference mark of 7–1, winning the WVIAC title. The Rams played their home games at Ram Stadium in Shepherdstown, West Virginia.

Regular season
The Rams went 9–1 in the regular season and advanced to the 2010 NCAA Division II football playoffs.

Playoffs
The Rams won their first playoff game, at home against .

Schedule

References

Shepherd
Shepherd Rams football seasons
Shepherd Rams football